Schalidomitra is a monotypic moth genus of the family Erebidae. Its only species, Schalidomitra ambages, is found in Botswana, Malawi, Mozambique, Tanzania and Zimbabwe. Both the genus and species were first described by Strand in 1911.

References

Calpinae
Monotypic moth genera